Abdul Aziz (Muhammad 'Abd al 'Aziz; 1855–1911) was a prominent Unani physician in British India.

Biography
Hakim Abdul Aziz was born into a family of Kashmiri migrants, and is regarded as the founder of the Lucknow tradition in Unani medicine. 
He started practising medicine in 1877. In 1902, he founded the Takmil al Tibb School at Lucknow for research and excellence in Unani Medicine.

The earliest biographical work on Hakim Abdul Aziz and his philosophical approach in Unani medicine was written by Hakim Syed Zillur Rahman. He wrote memoirs and life history of 'Azizi Family', prescriptions and formulations of Hakim Abdul Waheed, Unani formularies used by Azizi Family of Lucknow.

Epistemology 
Abdul Aziz’s approach with regards to Unani medicine was that of a puritan and hence, significantly different from other notable practitioners like Hakim Ajmal Khan who advocated incorporation of concepts from alternative medical systems. Consequently, the Delhi and Lucknow schools of Unani medicine evolved in different directions.
Hakim Abdul Aziz wished to systematise Unani instruction at the Lucknow Madrasa around the texts of Ibn Sìnà, supplemented by practical instruction in surgery and anatomy.

Impact
Hakim's fame was so widespread that students and practitioners of Unani medicine from as far and wide as the Punjab, Afghanistan, Balochistan, Bukhara and the Hejaz came to study with him. The Takmil al Tibb School (established by him at Lucknow) was instrumental in combating the widespread plague of 1902–03.

Coming to terms with the singular promotion of colonialism to allopathic medicine, in 1910 Hakim Abdul Aziz and Hakim Ajmal Khan and Pandit Madan Mohan Malviya formed the All India Ayurvedic and Unani Tibb Conference to defend traditional forms of healing. In 1904, recognizing the Hakim's stringent attitude towards adulteration in medicine, British India invited him to serve on the board of the Committee for Regulation of Medical Formulations.

Hakim Abdul Aziz did not charge visiting patients, though it is recorded that he solicited fees of 16 rupees for visits within the city, 500 rupees for visits outside the city, and 1000 rupees for visits outside the state. Among his royal patients were Shahjahan Begum of Bhopal and the son of Sayajirao Gaekwad III of Baroda.

Legacy 
In 1910, shortly after returning from Hajj, the Hakim fell ill and died. His death was widely mourned by poets, journalists and commoners. After his death, his two eldest sons took over the maintenance of Takmil al Tibb. A road in Lucknow is named after him (Abdul Aziz Road), and the college is now maintained by the government. The Azizi family is still involved in practice of Unani medicine. 
The Azizi Family also played a significant role in the Indian independence movement.

Hakim Syed Zillur Rahman published his Tazkirah Khandan Azizi in 1978. The work was 
widely received and reviewed. 
Similarly, his earlier Bayaz Wahidi (1974) and  Matab Murtaish (1976) were also reviewed in many Urdu journals.

See also 

 Hakim Mohammed Said
 Hakim Syed Karam Husain
 Hakim Ajmal Khan

References

Literature
 Tazkirah Khandan Azizi by Hakim Syed Zillur Rahman, (First edition 1978), Shifaul Mulk Memorial Committee, Aligarh, 472 pp; (Second revised edition 2009) , Ibn Sina Academy, Aligarh, 458 pp.
 The Azizi Family of Physicians by Tazimuddin Siddiqui and Hakim Syed Zillur Rahman, (1983), Studies in History of Medicine, Jamia Hamdard, New Delhi, 93 pp.
 Bayaz Waheedi by Hakim Syed Zillur Rahman, (1974), Shifaul Mulk Memorial Committee, Aligarh, 228pp, (Second edition 1991), Tibbi Academy, Aligarh, 224 pp.
 Matab Murtaish by Hakim Syed Zillur Rahman, (1976), Shifaul Mulk Memorial Committee, Aligarh, 230 pp.
 Maqalat Shifaul Mulk Hakim Abdul Latif by Hakim Syed Zillur Rahman, (2002), Publication Division, Aligarh Muslim University, Aligarh, pp 324.
 Tajideed-i Tibb by Shifa-al Mulk Hakim Abdul Latif, (1972), Tibbi Academy, Aligarh.
 Shifaul Mulk Hakim Abdul Latif (Nuqush wa Tassurat) by Hakim Mohammed Aslam Siddiqui (1985), Educational Book House, Aligarh.
 Listing at the Open Library Archive
 Shifa-al Mulk Hakim Abdul Latif by Hakim Syed Zillur Rahman, Daily Dawat, Delhi, 24 Jun 1971.
 Shifa-al Mulk Hakim Abdul Latif by Hakim Syed Zillur Rahman, Fikr-o-Nazar, Namwaran-i Aligarh, Vol. 1, Jan. 1987-Jul. 1988, pp. 361–70.
 Shifa-al Mulk Hakim Abdul Latif Falsafi by Hakim Syed Zillur Rahman, Bazm-e-Wafa, Aligarh Muslim University Old Boys' Association, Lucknow Branch, 1998, pp. 50–54.

See also 
 Unani medicine
 Hakim Ajmal Khan
 Jamia Hamdard
 Avicenna
 Mohammad Shakeel

External links
http://www.unani.com/timeline.htm 
https://web.archive.org/web/20110511171609/http://www.chowk.com/Views/Science/Science-in-India-During-The-Muslim-Rule

1855 births
1911 deaths
Kashmiri people
Scientists from Lucknow
19th-century Indian Muslims
20th-century Indian Muslims
19th-century Indian educational theorists
19th-century Indian medical doctors
Unani practitioners
20th-century Indian medical doctors
20th-century Indian educational theorists
Medical doctors from Uttar Pradesh